The J.League Best XI is an acknowledgement of the best eleven players in J.League.

J1 League (1993–present)

Multiple appearances

Appearances by club

Appearances by country

 Only in two occasions there was a full-Japanese Best XI (2009 and 2013).

J2 League (2022–present)

J3 League (2022–present)

J.League 20th Anniversary Team

See also
J.League awards
J.League Player of the Year
J.League Top Scorer
J.League Rookie of the Year
J.League Manager of the Year

References 

 ULTRAZONE Website : All-Time Award Winners 

J.League trophies and awards
Annual events in Japan